Cataloipus cognatus is a species of grasshopper in the family Acrididae. It is found in Asia (India, Pakistan) and Africa (Mozambique, Zimbabwe, South Africa).

References

External links 

 
 Cataloipus cognatus at Insectoid.info
 Cataloipus cognatus at GBIF
 Cataloipus cognatus at Interim Register of Marine and Non Marine Genera (IRMNG)

Acrididae
Insects described in 1870